Bakhtiari (and its variant Bakhtiary) is a surname of Persian origin. Notable people with the surname are as follows: 

Abu'l-Fath Khan Bakhtiari (died 1750), supreme chieftain of the Bakhtiari tribe
Ali Mardan Khan Bakhtiari (died 1754), supreme chieftain of the Bakhtiari tribe
Ali Morad Bakhtiari (died 1735), supreme chieftain of the Bakhtiari tribe
Ali Morteza Samsam Bakhtiari (1945–2007), Iranian author and oil expert
Ali-Qoli Khan Bakhtiari ((1856–1917), supreme chieftain of the Bakhtiari tribe and revolutionary
Alireza Bakhtiari, Iranian media executive
Behnoosh Bakhtiari (born 1975), Iranian actress
Bibi Maryam Bakhtiari (1874–1937), Iranian politician
David Bakhtiari (born 1991), American football player
Eric Bakhtiari (born 1984), American football player
Khalil Esfandiary-Bakhtiary (1901–1983), Iranian diplomat
Liliana Bakhtiari, Iranian American community organizer 
Morteza Bakhtiari (born 1952), Iranian politician
Najaf-Qoli Khan Bakhtiari (1846–1930), Iranian politician
Pouya Bakhtiari (1992–2019), Iranian activist
Shapour Bakhtiar (1914–1991), former prime minister of Iran
Soraya Esfandiary-Bakhtiary (1932–2001), former queen consort of Iran

Surnames of Iranian origin
Bakhtiari people